Lindsay Steven Carstairs FRCR (1919–1998) was a Scottish radiologist. Born in Glasgow, he served in the Royal Army Medical Corps during the Second World War and was present at the D-Day landings. He was associated with the Royal Northern Hospital for most of his career where he became a consultant radiologist. He was a fellow of the British Medical Association and, in retirement, curator of the museum of the Royal College of Radiologists.

References 

1919 births
1998 deaths
British radiologists
Medical doctors from Glasgow
Royal Army Medical Corps officers
20th-century Scottish medical doctors
Fellows of the British Medical Association
Fellows of the Royal College of Radiologists
British Army personnel of World War II